James Harmon Stack, (born January 21, 1992) known professionally as Jim-E Stack, is an American musician, songwriter, record producer, and DJ born in San Francisco, CA, and based in Los Angeles, CA. His solo releases have featured Bon Iver, Empress Of, Charli XCX, Ant Clemons, Jana Hunter of Lower Dens, and the Range. As a songwriter and record producer, Stack has collaborated with Dominic Fike, Kacy Hill, Octavian, Bon Iver, Joji, Caroline Polachek, Haim, Diplo, Empress Of, and more. He has remixed Wet, Anna of the North, Rostam, Active Child, and Lower Dens, as well as other artists.

Career

2011-2016: Early years, Tell Me I Belong 
Born James Harmon Stack, Jim-E Stack grew up in San Francisco's Inner Richmond, where his passion for music evolved from playing in garage rock bands and jazz bands to making beats inspired by Daft Punk, Burial, J Dilla, Timbaland, and The Neptunes. While Jim-E lived in New Orleans and Brooklyn, his original releases and EPs, in addition to remixes for Sky Ferreira and ASAP Rocky, garnered critical acclaim and interest. It would lead to his debut 2014 album, Tell Me I Belong, accompanied by touring with Shlohmo and Bonobo.

2016–present: Collaborations, EPHEMERA 
Returning to California in 2016, Stack continued to release new solo material, including collaborations with fellow electronic artist The Range, as well as solo releases featuring Noonie Bao, Rostam, Charli XCX, and more. Between then and early 2019, he collaborated with Empress Of, Diplo, and Caroline Polachek for their own music, in addition to contributing on songs for Haim.

Stack contributed heavily to Kacy Hill's second studio album Is It Selfish If We Talk About Me Again, released July 2020. The pair are now dating, and Hill states Stack acted as inspiration for much of the album's lyrical content in the liner notes of the record.

From late 2019 through 2020, Stack released new singles featuring Ant Clemons, Empress Of, Dijon and Bon Iver, along with an announcement for a new album titled EPHEMERA. It features the aforementioned singles, with other collaborations with Octavian, Bearface of Brockhampton and Kacy Hill. Stack also released a CD exclusive EP in October 2021, sold for free only at one store in New York and London.

Stack was again a primary collaborator in the creation of Kacy Hill's Simple, Sweet, and Smiling album, which released October 2021.

Discography

Studio albums

EPs

Singles

Remixes

Songwriting and production discography

External links 
 
 https://genius.com/artists/Jim-e-stack

Living people
American DJs
American male songwriters
21st-century American musicians
Electronic dance music DJs
21st-century American male musicians
1992 births